The 6th Women's Boat Race took place on 29 February 1936. The contest was between crews from the Universities of Oxford and Cambridge and held on the River Thames.

Background
The first Women's Boat Race was conducted on The Isis in 1927.

Crews
Cambridge were represented by Newnham while Oxford saw a mix of St Hugh's and Oxford Home-Students.

Race
The race took place between Godstow and Binsey along the Upper River Thames.

The contest was won by Oxford, with the victory taking the overall record in the competition to 4–2 in their favour.

See also
The Boat Race 1936

References

External links
 Official website

Women's Boat Race
1936 in English sport
February 1936 sports events
Boat
Boat
1936 sports events in London